Abu Barkat Ataur Ghani Khan Choudhury (1 November 1927 – 14 April 2006), known as Barkatda to his supporters, was an Indian politician from West Bengal, India. Choudhury was a senior leader of Indian National Congress party. His home is in English Bazar, Malda, West Bengal

Political career
Ghani Khan Choudhury was first elected as an MLA to the West Bengal state legislative assembly in 1957, winning the seat in 1962, 1967, 1971 and 1972. He served as a State Cabinet Minister in the Government of West Bengal from 1972 to 1977. First elected to the 7th Lok Sabha in 1980 from Malda, Choudhury would go on to represent the constituency for eight straight terms, winning again in 1984, 1989, 1991, 1996, 1998, 1999 and 2004. From 1982 to 1984, Choudhury served as the Minister of Railways in Indira Gandhi's and Rajiv Gandhi's governments. He took active part in introducing the Kolkata Metro Railway and Circular Railways in the city of Kolkata, and towards establishing the Malda Town railway station as one of the most important stations of the region. For his contributions, Choudhury is often respected as the architect of modern Malda.

Early life
Ghani Khan was the son of Abu Hyat Khan Chowdhury and Saleha Khatoon.

Controversy 
Choudhury had claimed to be a barrister-at-law, called to the Bar from one of London's Inns of Court, while providing biographical information to the Indian Parliament. However, the claim was found to be false by an election tribunal, and Choudhury was criticised by opposition politicians, such as Jyoti Basu (himself a barrister from London, who had also threatened to bring a motion against Choudhury), George Fernandes and Indrajit Gupta. Choudhury attributed the incorrect information to an "oversight".

Personal life 
Ghani Khan Choudhury was married to Esther who left India in 1963 and settled in Switzerland. He is survived by his three children, son Simon Hyat Khan Choudhury, daughters Yasmin Khan Choudhry and Neelam Khan Choudhury. Choudhury's siblings, all politicians, are Abu Nasar Khan Choudhury, Abu Hasem Khan Choudhury and Rubi Noor.

Legacy
Ghani Khan Choudhury Institute of Engineering & Technology (GKCIET), Malda, West Bengal was established in 2010 by the Ministry of Human Resource Development, Govt. of India under the mentorship of the National Institute of Technology, Durgapur and in the memory of Sri A.B.A. Ghani Khan Choudhury.

References

External links
 
 
 

Indian National Congress politicians from West Bengal
People from Malda district
Politicians from Kolkata
Bengali Muslims
India MPs 2004–2009
West Bengal MLAs 1967–1969
West Bengal MLAs 1969–1971
West Bengal MLAs 1971–1972
West Bengal MLAs 1972–1977
West Bengal MLAs 1977–1982
Railway Ministers of India
1927 births
2006 deaths
India MPs 1980–1984
India MPs 1984–1989
India MPs 1989–1991
India MPs 1991–1996
India MPs 1996–1997
India MPs 1998–1999
India MPs 1999–2004
Lok Sabha members from West Bengal
20th-century Bengalis